"Bye Bye Love" is a song by the American Boston-based rock band The Cars. The song appears on the band's 1978 debut album The Cars. It was written by singer/songwriter/bandleader Ric Ocasek and sung by bassist Benjamin Orr.

Background
"Bye Bye Love" is one of The Cars' oldest songs, dating back to the mid-1970s. The song was first performed, and recorded as a demo, by the band Cap'n Swing, which featured Ocasek, Orr, and guitarist Elliot Easton as members. In this early version, the recurring keyboard theme between the verse lyrics was significantly different.

The song was later revived to appear on The Cars in 1978. Although the song was not released as a single, it has received regular airplay since the album was released.

Reception
Rolling Stone critic Kit Rachlis said in his review of The Cars that "the songs bristle and -- in their harsher, more angular moments ('Bye Bye Love,' 'Don't Cha Stop') -- bray." Jaime Welton, author of 1001 Albums You Must Hear Before You Die, described the track as a "fan favorite", praising Elliot Easton as an "unsung hero, littering songs like 'Bye Bye Love' with staggeringly good fills." AllMusic critic Greg Prato called it one of the "lesser-known compositions [that] are just as exhilarating" as the "familiar hits" on The Cars.

References

1978 songs
The Cars songs
Songs written by Ric Ocasek
Song recordings produced by Roy Thomas Baker